Leonard Woods may refer to:
Leonard Woods, black American man lynched by a mob in 1927, see Lynching of Leonard Woods
Leonard Woods (theologian) (1774–1854), American theologian
Leonard Woods (college president) (1807–1878), his son, president of Bowdoin College

See also
Leonard Wood (disambiguation)